The Levant Fleet was the designation under the Ancien Regime for the naval vessels of the Royal French Navy in the Mediterranean. The fleet carried out operations such as asserting naval supremacy and protecting convoys. Its counterpart was the Flotte du Ponant, which saw service in the English Channel and in the Atlantic Ocean.

Arsenals 
At first based in Fréjus, from the beginning of the 17th century the fleet was based at two specialized arsenals:
 At Marseille, for galleys (from 1665 to 1750)
 At Toulon, for the sailing ships

Flagships 

The flagship was always the most powerful ship present in Toulon. Under Louis XIV this was the either 110-gun  constructed in 1667 and destroyed in 1690 or her successor, also named , constructed in 1692. The gun decks of these vessels were painted red, upper decks in blue, picked out with gilding. Under Louis XVI the flagships were the 110-gun  constructed in 1780 and then the 118-gun   constructed in 1788.

Vice admirals 
The command of the Levant and the Ponant fleets were entrusted on 12 November 1669 to two vice-admirals. The first vice-admiral of the Levant was Anne Hilarion de Costentin, Comte de Tourville, designated as such in 1669. Louis XIV had intended to appoint Abraham Duquesne to share the post, but he died in 1688, and the Comte de Tourville continued in the post until 1701.

Although Tourville commanded the fleet during the battles of the reign of Louis XIV, his successors were too old to have likely served at sea. In practice, the squadrons at sea were under officers with the rank of Lieutenant général des Armées navales.

Administration 
The Fleet of the Levant was renamed the "Mediterranean Squadron" (escadre de la Méditerranée, :fr:Escadre de la Méditerranée) after the French Revolution. The fleet was successively almost annihilated during the Siege of Toulon in 1793 and during the battles of the Nile in 1798 and Trafalgar in 1805.

The term "Fleet of the Levant" was temporary readopted after the French Restoration and the July Monarchy.

References

Bibliography 
 Rémi Monaque, Une histoire de la marine de guerre française, Paris, éditions Perrin, 2016, total pages 526 
 Michel Vergé-Franceschi, La marine française au XVIII, guerres, administration, exploration, Regards sur l'histoire, Paris, SEDES editions, 1996, total pages 451 .
 Michel Vergé-Franceschi, Toulon: port royal, 1481–1789, Tallandier, 2002 – 329 pages

Navy of the Ancien Régime